Stabulnieki Parish is an administrative unit of Preiļi Municipality in the Latgale region of Latvia. At the beginning of 2014, the population of the parish was 832. The administrative center is Stabulnieki village.

Towns, villages and settlements of Stabulnieki Parish 
 Pastari
 Polkorona
 Stabulnieki
 Ūgaiņi-Puduļi

References 

Parishes of Latvia
Preiļi Municipality
Latgale